In the Name of the People is a 1939 German crime film directed by Erich Engels and starring Rudolf Fernau, Fritz Kampers, and Rolf Weih.

The film's sets were designed by the art directors Hans Sohnle and Wilhelm Vorwerg. It was shot at the Babelsberg Studios in Berlin.

Synopsis
A dangerous criminal, just released from jail in England, goes on a violent spree robbing motorists on the roads of Bavaria.

Cast

References

Bibliography

External links 
 

1939 films
Films of Nazi Germany
German crime films
1939 crime films
1930s German-language films
Terra Film films
Films directed by Erich Engels
Films shot at Babelsberg Studios
Films set in Bavaria
1930s German films